The Big Rainbow heirloom tomato is one of dozens of large fruited yellow tomatoes with red swirls. They have a mild, sweet flavor. The Hillbilly tomato is another similar-coloured tomato.

Big Rainbow tomatoes can be cultivated in the last month of summer.

History 
Big Rainbow tomato was first presented by Dorothy Beiswenger of Crookston in Seed Savers Exchange 1983, Minnesota. Commercially, Big Rainbow tomato was presented in 1990.

Cultivation 
This sort of tomato cannot stand cold and must be cultivated in warm conditions.

See also
 List of tomato cultivars

References

Heirloom tomato cultivars